Schwarzenberg is a mountain of Hesse, Germany.

Mountains of Hesse
Hills of the Gladenbach Uplands